Johann Michael Weinkopf (15 September 1780 – 8 March 1862) was an Austrian operatic bass and actor.

Life 
Born in Kirchberg am Walde,. Weinkopf first belonged to the ensemble of the Theater an der Wien and impersonated the role of Minister Don Fernando at the premiere of Beethoven's Fidelio on 20 November 1805, as well as at the two performances of the second version of the opera on 29 March and 10 April 1806.

From 15 June 1807 to 1809 and from 1814 to 30 November 1821 he was a member of the Vienna Court Theatre.

In later years Weinkopf was choir master of the choir boys at the court opera house, singer at St. Stephen's Cathedral and chapel master at the St. Michael court parish church.

Around 1835 he directed a "Musik- und Singlehranstalt" in the small Michaelerhaus (today Michaelerplatz 6).

Weinkopf died in Vienna at age 81.

Further reading 
 Katalog der Portrait-Sammlung der k. u. k. General-Intendanz der k. k. Hoftheater. Zugleich ein biographisches Hilfsbuch auf dem Gebiet von Theater und Musik. Zweite Abtheilung. Gruppe IV. Wiener Hoftheater, Vienna 1892, 
 Alexander Wheelock Thayer, Ludwig van Beethovens Leben, edited by Hermann Deiters, volume 3, Leipzig 1917
 Willy Hess, Das Fidelio-Buch, Winterthur 1986

References 

19th-century Austrian male opera singers
Operatic basses
1780 births
1862 deaths